The Bamum, sometimes called Bamoum, Bamun, Bamoun, or Mum, are a Grassfields ethnic group of Cameroon with around 215,000 members.

Religion
The Bamum traditional religion placed great emphasis on ancestral spirits which were embodied in the skulls of the deceased ancestors. The eldest males of each lineage had possession of the skulls of deceased males. When moving a diviner must find an appropriate place to hold the skull. Despite these efforts some men's skulls remained unclaimed and their spirits are deemed restless. Ceremonies are thus done to placate these spirits. There is also respect for female skulls, but the details are less documented.

They also believed women made the soil fruitful, thus women did the planting and harvesting. Masks and representations of the head also had importance. In modern times, many Bamum are Muslim or Christian. King Ibrahim Njoya himself converted to Islam then to Christianity and then back to Islam after the Treaty of Versailles. He is said to have disliked abstaining from polygamy when Christian, and from alcohol when Muslim, so ultimately split the difference toward the end.

Writing system

Bamum language (Shüpamom, pronounced , "language Bamum"; in the French tradition spelled Bamoun) is one of the Benue–Congo languages of Cameroon, with approximately 215,000 speakers. The language is particularly well known for its original phonetic script, developed by Sultan Njoya and his palace circle around 1895. The development of the script spanned ideographic to syllabic systems, with the script's final and most prominent form known as "A-ka-u-ku." This is not to be confused with another of Njoya's inventions, an artificial spoken language known as Shümom, which was devised after the script. Outsider observers in recent years have tended to confuse the script with the invented language. The French colonials destroyed Njoya's schools and forbade the teaching of the script, which fell into rapid decline and today hovers on the brink of extinction (the Bamum Scripts and Archives Project, in Foumban, is teaching the script to young people to spread literacy), but the Shümom language is spoken as a second language by many people and is taught on the radio throughout the Bamum kingdom. Cameroonian musicians Claude Ndam and Gerryland are native speakers of Bamum and use it in their music.

Nguon

Nguon is a significant holiday for the Bamoun people.  Recently, Ngoun has taken place every two years in late November-early December.

Art

See also
List of rulers of the Bamum
Bamum kingdom

External links

Bamum Scripts and Archives Project
University of Iowa  on African Art

Ethnic groups in Cameroon
Semi-Bantu